Elizabeth Abellana Zimmerman (born April 14, 1948) is the former wife of Rodrigo Duterte, the 16th President of the Philippines, and the mother of incumbent Vice President Sara Duterte.

Early life
Her parents are from Hilongos, Leyte and Tuburan, Cebu. According to Rodrigo Duterte, she is of patrilineal Jewish descent, with her father having fled to the Philippines from Nazi Germany. She attended the Ateneo de Davao and subsequently worked as a flight stewardess for Philippine Airlines.

Politics
Zimmerman ran for city councilor of Davao City in 2001 but lost. She joined the Biyaheng DU30 bus caravan which went around the Visayas and Mindanao, in support of her former husband's presidential bid in 2016.

Personal life
Zimmerman was married to Davao City mayor Rodrigo Duterte (who later became the President of the Philippines) for over 25 years. She has three children with him, named Paolo, Sara and Baste. She filed for a civil annulment in 1998, and for a few months, lived with her brother in Metro Manila, occasionally visiting Davao City since her children were still studying there. Duterte has admitted that Zimmerman had left him after she caught him in adultery. The civil annulment was granted in 2000. After the annulment, Zimmerman remained friends with her former husband. She chose to continue using "Duterte" as part of her surname despite the annulment, saying that her marriage with Duterte has never been declared null by the Catholic Church. She has eleven grandchildren: five from her son Paolo, three from her daughter Sara, and three from youngest son, Baste. She also has two great-grandchildren.

In August 2015, Zimmerman was diagnosed with stage 3 breast cancer, but was declared fully recovered in October 2016. Her recovery then led to her becoming a breast cancer advocate. “Because God gave me a second chance in life," she said in an interview, "I should advocate for this very noble cause, to become a source of awareness, support and hope to others who are suffering the same as I did.”

References

1948 births
Living people
Visayan people
People from Davao City
Filipino people of German-Jewish descent
Filipino people of American-Jewish descent
Duterte family
Flight attendants
Ateneo de Davao University alumni
Spouses of presidents of the Philippines